Rachel Anne Sutherland (born 3 August 1976 in Nelson, New Zealand) is a field hockey player from New Zealand, who represented her native country at the 2004 Summer Olympics in Athens, Greece. There she finished in sixth place with the Women's National Team, wearing the number five jersey. Sutherland was affiliated with Emeralds, Manawatu.

References

External links
 

1976 births
Living people
New Zealand female field hockey players
Olympic field hockey players of New Zealand
Field hockey players at the 2004 Summer Olympics
Sportspeople from Nelson, New Zealand
People educated at Waimea College